Four is an Indian soap opera on SAB TV.

Plot 
Four is a story of four friends: Rocky, TP, Mannu and Rattu. They are determined to achieve their dreams. It is a show on how these friends have to face all the hardships sometimes together united and otherwise alone.

Cast 
Vipul Gupta as Rakesh
Manasi Parekh as Taranpreet
Sameer Sharma as Mannat
Raj Singh Arora as Ratanlal
Kurush Deboo as Landlord Nariman Bookwalla aka Parsi Uncle

References 

Sony SAB original programming
Indian drama television series
2007 Indian television series debuts
2007 Indian television series endings